Bob Dylan: the Collection is the third iTunes complete digital album, following The Complete U2 and The Complete Stevie Wonder. It includes 773 songs and a 100-page digital booklet. The price was $199.99, although iTunes usually charges $0.99 per song. This package was removed from iTunes in December 2009.

Track listing

References

2007 compilation albums
Albums produced by Barry Beckett
Albums produced by Bob Dylan
Albums produced by Bob Johnston
Albums produced by Brendan O'Brien (record producer)
Albums produced by Chuck Plotkin
Albums produced by Daniel Lanois
Albums produced by David Was
Albums produced by Don DeVito
Albums produced by Don Was
Albums produced by Garth Hudson
Albums produced by Glyn Johns
Albums produced by Jerry Wexler
Albums produced by John Hammond (producer)
Albums produced by Leon Russell
Albums produced by Levon Helm
Albums produced by Mark Knopfler
Albums produced by Richard Manuel
Albums produced by Rick Danko
Albums produced by Rob Fraboni
Albums produced by Robbie Robertson
Albums produced by Robert Blackwell
Albums produced by Tom Wilson (record producer)
Bob Dylan compilation albums
ITunes-exclusive releases